Monique Alves Frankenhuis  (August 7, 1962 – August 29, 1994 in Rio de Janeiro), best known as Monique Alves, was a Brazilian actress, daughter of Jean Pierre Frankenhuis and Alcina Maria Fernandes Alves. She died in 1994 due to complications from leukemia. She was married to director Dennis Carvalho (Rede Globo), with whom she had a daughter, Tainah, now mother of Nina and Lara.

Filmography

Film

References

External links

1962 births
1994 deaths
Brazilian film actresses
Actresses from Rio de Janeiro (city)